Donald William Hammond (born April 1, 1957) is an American professional golfer who has played on the PGA Tour, Nationwide Tour, and Champions Tour.

Hammond was born in Frederick, Maryland. He attended Jacksonville University in Jacksonville, Florida and was a member of the golf team. He turned pro in 1979 and joined the PGA Tour in 1983. Hammond earned his tour card by being medalist at the 1982 PGA Tour Qualifying School at TPC-Sawgrass by a record 14 strokes.

Hammond has won two PGA Tour events in his career: The 1986 Bob Hope Chrysler Classic and the 1989 Texas Open. In winning his second PGA Tour title by 7 strokes (258) over Paul Azinger, he came within one stroke of the then-Tour scoring record. His best finish in a major is a T-5 at the 1992 British Open. During his PGA Tour career, he amassed 40 top-10 finishes.

Hammond played on the Tour from 1983 until 1998. After his PGA Tour career declined, he competed on what was then the Buy.com Tour, where he won once in 2000. On turning fifty years of age in 2007, Hammond began playing on the Champions Tour.

Hammond is a charter member of the Jacksonville University Sports Hall of Fame.

Hammond has four children, one son Matthew, three daughters Brittany, Brooke, and Halle. He lives in Heathrow, Florida, north of Orlando.

Professional wins (7)

PGA Tour wins (2)

PGA Tour playoff record (1–0)

Buy.com Tour wins (1)

Other wins (4)
1982 Florida Open
1989 Jerry Ford Invitational (tie with Ted Schulz)
1990 Jerry Ford Invitational (tie with Jim Gallagher Jr. and Andy North)
1993 Jerry Ford Invitational (tie with Jay Delsing, and Jim Thorpe)

Results in major championships

CUT = missed the half-way cut
"T" = tied

Summary

Most consecutive cuts made – 6 (1990 Open Championship – 1992 Open Championship)
Longest streak of top-10s – 1 (twice)

See also
1982 PGA Tour Qualifying School graduates
1991 PGA Tour Qualifying School graduates
1996 PGA Tour Qualifying School graduates
2002 PGA Tour Qualifying School graduates

References

External links

Bio on Jacksonville University Dolphins Hall of Fame site

American male golfers
PGA Tour golfers
PGA Tour Champions golfers
Golfers from Maryland
Golfers from Florida
Jacksonville University alumni
Sportspeople from Frederick, Maryland
People from Heathrow, Florida
1957 births
Living people